The New Zealand cricket team and the Sri Lanka cricket team toured the United States in May. This was the first time Full Members of the International Cricket Council met in an official match in the United States. All matches were played at Central Broward Regional Park in Lauderhill, Florida.

The tournament was scheduled to be of 3 Twenty20 Internationals between the teams but due to substandard lights in the stadium, the 1st match scheduled to be held on 20 May was cancelled as it was a Night game.

Background 
Both teams came straight from the 2010 ICC World Twenty20 in the West Indies to Florida.

Squads

Twenty20 Series

1st T20I

2nd T20I

Coverage 
 Sky Sport – New Zealand
 Star Cricket – India
 ESPN – United Kingdom
 Supersport 2 – South Africa
 Caribbean Media Corporation – West Indies
 Star Cricket – Singapore
 Fox Sports – Australia
 Geo Super – Pakistan
 ESPN3 – USA

See also 
 United States v Canada (1844)

References

External links 
 Tournament Page

International cricket competitions in 2010
United States cricket in the 21st century
United States in international cricket
New Zealand 2010
Sri Lanka 2010
2010 in American sports
2009–10 New Zealand cricket season
2010 in Sri Lankan cricket
2010 in sports in Florida
Cricket in Florida